Woodie Woodie Airport  is related to the Woodie Woodie Mine, in the Pilbara region of Western Australia.

See also
 List of airports in Western Australia
 Aviation transport in Australia

References

External links
 Airservices Aerodromes & Procedure Charts

Pilbara airports
Shire of East Pilbara